Alexandra Scodigor-Remenco (1897–1959) was a Romanian educator from Chişinău, Bessarabia. She founded an orphanage in 1929 that became a model institution for pre-school education in Romania. The orphanage was visited by Maria Montessori in 1938, when Alexandra Remenco was invited to the Vatican for an audience with Pope Pius XI.

Biography
Alexandra Scodigor was born in 1897, in Peresecina and studied in Orhei and Odessa. In the fall of 1917, Scodigor married to Dumitru Remenco and they had two children, Gheorghe Remenco (November 19, 1918, Chişinău – October 29, 1977, Chişinău) and Sergiu (b. Chişinău).

In 1929, she founded the orphanage "Casa copilului", which became a model institution for pre-school education. Her efforts became known in Romania and elsewhere. In 1938 the orphanage was visited by Maria Montessori, who encouraged her ideas at a conference in Rome. That same year Alexandra Remenco was invited to the Vatican for an audience with Pope Pius XI to come.

After the Soviet occupation of Bessarabia, the orphanage was closed. Remenco withdrew back to this in the near Ploiești, where she worked as a nurse. After World War II she worked as a teacher at a primary school in Chişinău. She was buried at the Central cemetery on Armenească Street, Chişinău.

Bibliography 
 Donos, Alexandru. În dar oamenilor: [Schiţă despre jurnalistul Gheorghe Remenco] // Nistru, 1979, Nr. 7, pp. 115–121.
 Iurie Colesnic, Destinul tragic al unui filozof din Basarabia interbelică: despre Dumitru Remenco (1895–1940), filozof, ziarist la "Cuvânt moldovenesc", "Glasul Basarabiei", Viaţa Basarabiei, 2004, Nr. 2. pp. 210–220.

References

External links 
 CONTRIBUŢII PRIVIND ACTIVITATEA ORFELINATULUI „CASA COPILULUI” DIN CHIŞINĂU, Vera Stăvilă, Muzeul Naţional de Arheologie şi Istorie a Moldovei, str. 31 August, 121-A, MD-2012 Chişinău, Republica Moldova (2007) – Artikel (Moldavisch)
 Contribution to the study of the activity of the Chişinău orphanage “Children’s home”
 Dumitru I. Remenco – ziarist şi filosof
 Destinul tragic al unui filozof din Basarabia interbelică : [despre Dumitru Remenco (1895–1940), filozof, ziarist la "Cuvânt moldovenesc", "Glasul Basarabiei"

1890s births
1959 deaths
People from Orhei District
Romanian educators